Wang Xiao (born August 30, 1979) is a retired Chinese football player who previously played for Yunnan Hongta and Tianjin Teda F.C. as a centre-back.

Club career

Yunnan Hongta
Wang Xiao was born in Shenyang, Liaoning.  He originally began his football career with the Liaoning F.C. youth team in 1994 until 1998 when he spent a short period with the Chinese national youth team. He would return to Liaoning F.C. youth team the following year and would remain with them until 2000 when he left after being unable to break into their senior team. He would instead move to Yunnan Hongta in 2001 to begin his professional football career and in his debut season he quickly established himself as a regular for the senior team. An integral member of the Yunnan team for the following seasons Wang Xiao time at the club was cut short when Chongqing Lifan F.C. decided to merge with Yunnan and Wang Xiao was allowed to leave.

Tianjin Teda F.C.
He transferred to Tianjin Teda F.C. at the beginning of the 2004 Chinese Super League season and would make his club debut when he played in their first game on the season on May 15, 2004 against Chongqing Lifan F.C. in a 0–0 draw. By the following season he had established himself as a key member of the team and by the 2006 league season he had become the team's captain after Yu Genwei retired. His reputation at Tianjin would grow when he was able to lead them to their first continental cup campaign in the 2009 AFC Champions League, however his poor performance within the campaign saw him stripped of the captaincy and it given to Cao Yang. Injury and suspensions would then see Wang Xiao miss much of the league season to end a disappointing 2009 league season. During 2010, he became the team captain again after former captain Cao Yang got injured at the beginning of the season 2010. Later he got injured after several games, his teammate Marko Zorić took his armband. After fighting with serious injuries, he had announced his retirement after season. He also mentioned that he is going to stay and become a coach in the team.

International career
Wang Xiao would make his official senior debut on October 28, 2007 against Myanmar in a FIFA World Cup qualification game that China won 4–0. Under the recently appointed Chinese head coach Vladimir Petrović he was an integral member of his team and was named as the vice captain for Chinese National Team in their unsuccessful 2010 FIFA World Cup qualification campaign. After Vladimir Petrović left Wang Xiao would play one further game for China on January 14, 2009 against Syria in an AFC Asian Cup qualification game that China lost 3–2.

References

External links

Player stats at sohu.com

1979 births
Living people
Footballers from Shenyang
Chinese footballers
China international footballers
Yunnan Hongta players
Tianjin Jinmen Tiger F.C. players
Chinese Super League players
Association football central defenders